Edward Joseph Daly (November 22, 1922 – January 21, 1984) was a U.S. businessman most notable for his ownership of World Airways which he bought in 1950 and actively managed until 1982. Under his ownership, the airline was notable for humanitarian efforts that drew national attention during the Vietnam War, as well as its pioneering low fare and no-frills service.

Early life 
Daly was born to Edward Michael Daly and Elizabeth Grace in Chicago on November 22, 1922. His father, a firefighter, died when he was 15 years old. Daly helped support his family by working as an onion topper during the summers and managing a trucking firm while attending college. The trucking firm operated three tractors and five trailers when he sold it. He was a Golden Gloves boxer, developing skills that he would use in Vietnam. Daly rejected his image as a kid from the Chicago slums, though he admitted that the period after his father's death was one of financial difficulty.

He attended the University of Illinois, where he majored in biochemical engineering before he was drafted in 1941 to serve in World War II. Daly said it was just as well that he never completed his degree, because "I was the world's worst chemical engineer". Daly achieved the rank of sergeant in the Army and served in the Pacific theater. Some details about his military service that are mentioned yet not confirmed by other sources are that Daly was a technical sergeant, that he was based on either the Marshall Islands or on Saipan and Tinian (the Marianas Islands). and that he was injured, though how is not specified. .

Career 
After his discharge from the Army in Los Angeles, Daly worked for six months as a bank teller at Security First National Bank. 
Deciding that banking was not for him, he worked for Scotty O'Carroll at Midway Airport in Chicago, where he was in charge of bookings for all non-scheduled airline flights and rose to become vice-president of the firm.

Airline 
After a few years' experience, Daly left the charter company with a desire to own something of his own and in 1950, at age 26, he purchased a fledgling airline, World Airways, which at the time was mainly transporting military cargo. He purchased the airline for $50,000 from the Berkovich Steamship Company, though the source of the money is disputed. One story claims that he won the $50,000 in a poker match. Daly, however, denied this story, because his favorite game was Gin rummy. Another more probable narrative is that he borrowed the money from a small trucking company. In the end, Daly paid little for an airline that he managed successfully and which produced millions of dollars of profit. To illustrate how little he paid for World Airways, Daly later bought an old military surplus plane for $75,000 which he then sold for $175,000. The airline's chief asset was its rights to fly commercial aircraft, and Daly established a name for himself in the commercial aviation industry. He also founded National Air Freight Forwarding Inc., the first air freight forwarding company in the world. 

He is noted in particular for his concept of "no-frills" flights. His battle against the Civil Aeronautics Board for deregulation of supplemental air carriers earned him a term as leader of their trade association and their chief spokesman. His other large business venture was First Western Bank and Trust Company.  Daly sold the bank in 1974 to Lloyd's Bank of London for $115 million in cash. Meanwhile, he kept control of World Airways through his ownership of 80% of its stock.

Philanthropy 
Daly gave generously to a range of charitable causes. Among them were free flights to Muslims traveling on the Hajj to Mecca, and transportation of a baby elephant to the Oakland Zoo and of giraffes to the zoo in Mexico City  . He personally funded circus trips annually for 5000 Oakland children, provided tickets to Nutcracker Ballet for 1000 of them, and tickets to the Ice Follies for 2000 of them. He also built a swimming pool for Alameda County wards . Despite not having a son, Daly continuously supported the Boy Scouts of America, and he created a scholarship fund for students from West Africa, South Korea, and Jordan.. From 1962 to 1968, Daly served as the chairman of the board of regents at Santa Clara University, and his donations helped build the university science center named in his honor. He also served as chairman of the Oakland branch of the National Alliance of Businessmen, and was a staunch supporter of the Cerebral Palsy Center in Alameda, California, directing the Center's fundraising. In 1966 Daly received the "Man of the Hour" award from the City of Oakland for his efforts to promote the employment of persons from racial minorities. He also gave Greenpeace $10,000 to fuel its ships. 

His generous attitude and courage was revealed most famously in 1975 when he rescued women and children at Da Nang in South Vietnam aboard one of his World Airways planes. These flights cost Daly millions of dollars and almost cost him his life once. Annoyed when his contracted airlifts had been prematurely canceled, and eager to obtain new approval from the U.S. government and the South Vietnamese government in Saigon, Daly assembled some of his flight crews to airlift South Vietnamese refugees. Without official permission, he and one of his crews took off from Ton Son Nhut Airport in Saigon and flew to Da Nang, where mobs of civilians and soldiers rushed the plane. It never stopped taxiing on the runway while crowds of people clamored to get aboard. Trying to prevent soldiers from boarding the plane, Daly fired his pistol in the air, but he was unable to restore order and was injured by some soldiers. When the crew finally raised the ladder, they were attacked with bullets and grenades. The flight crew praised Daly for his valiant effort in rescuing the refugees.

Yet, Daly was extremely modest about his philanthropy, trying to keep it out of the spotlight. in sharp contrast to the flashy full-page advertisements he purchased for World Airways to promote its business.  Articles that discussed his donations often stated things such as, "Daly quietly has been giving…", " I don't want to be mentioned, I mean it. No way". In one article describing his scholarship fund, the author wrote that Daly simply would not talk about it. Still, he was willing to discuss his efforts to provide jobs to minority persons.

Personal life 
Daly married June Chandler in October 1949. A former flight attendant for Pan American Airlines, she later helped Daly run World Airways, becoming deputy chairman after his death.

In 1971 he stepped down as president and in 1982 retired from business due to failing health. He died on January 21, 1984, at 61 years of age.

Notes and citations

External links

1922 births
1984 deaths
American aviation businesspeople
Businesspeople from Chicago
Philanthropists from Illinois
World Airways
20th-century American businesspeople
United States Army personnel of World War II
United States Army soldiers
20th-century American philanthropists